The Alexander von Humboldt Foundation is a foundation established by the government of the Federal Republic of Germany and funded by the Federal Foreign Office, the Federal Ministry of Education and Research, the Federal Ministry for Economic Cooperation and Development as well as other national and international partners; it promotes international academic cooperation between excellent scientists and scholars from Germany and from abroad.

Description 
Every year, the Foundation grants more than 700 competitive research fellowships and awards, primarily going to academics from natural sciences (mathematics included) and the humanities. It allows scientists and scholars from all over the world to come to Germany to work on a research project they have chosen themselves together with a host and collaborative partner. Additionally it funds German scholars' via the Feodor Lynen Fellowships to go anywhere in the world to work on a research project with a host and collaborative partner, who must have held an Alexander von Humboldt fellowship themself. In particular, these fellowships and awards include a number of large prizes, such as Humboldt Professorships and Sofia Kovalevskaya Awards. Fellowships and awards from the Foundation are considered to be among the most prestigious and generous awards in Germany; the alumni network is the foundation's greatest asset, comprising over 26,000 Humboldtians in more than 140 countries — including 57 Nobel laureates.

History  

The Foundation was initially established in Berlin in 1860 in order to provide German scientists support to do research in other countries. In 1923, when hyperinflation was crippling much of the Weimar Republic’s economy, the Foundation ceased operations due to capital constraints. It was re-established by the German Reich in 1925, although its new goal was to attract and support talented, pro-German students from other countries to study and research in Germany. The fall of Germany in 1945 led to the Foundation’s closure for a second time, until it was re-established in Bonn-Bad Godesberg on December 10, 1953, with a new President, the renowned physicist Werner Heisenberg, and a new goal “to grant fellowships to academics of foreign nationality, without regard to gender, race, religion, or ideology, to enable them to continue their academic training by a study-visit to Germany“. In 2016 the Foundation helped establish the German Section of the Scholars at Risk (SAR) network, a group of research institutions,  universities, and science organizations committed to supporting at-risk academics and promoting academic freedom.

See also
Alexander von Humboldt
Humboldt Prize (Humboldt Research Award)
Max Planck-Humboldt Research Award
Sofia Kovalevskaya Award

References

External links
 
 Sofia Kovalevskaya Award

Scientific research foundations
Scientific societies based in Germany
Organisations based in Bonn
Alexander von Humboldt